Hope Lake is a lake in Meeker County, in the U.S. state of Minnesota.

Hope Lake was originally spelled Hoop Lake, so named for the lake's hoop-shaped outline.

See also
List of lakes in Minnesota

References

Lakes of Minnesota
Lakes of Meeker County, Minnesota